Marc-Aurèle Caillard (born 12 May 1994) is a French professional footballer who plays as a goalkeeper for FC Metz.

Career
After being a regular for the reserves, Caillard made his debut for AS Monaco in a 2–0 away loss to Reims in Ligue 2. The following season, Monaco won the Ligue 2, while Caillard was an unused substitute in two matches.

He signed with Clermont Foot following the expiration of his Monaco contract in July 2015.

In June 2017, Caillard signed a one-year contract with En Avant de Guingamp. On 29 January 2019, he came on as a substitute in the penalty shootout for Guingamp in their Coupe de la Ligue semifinal against Monaco. Caillard saved two penalties and Guingamp advanced 5–4, sending the team to their first Coupe de La Ligue final in the team's history.

He joined Metz on 20 July 2020 on a free transfer.

Honours
Monaco
Ligue 2: 2012–13

References

External links

 

1994 births
Living people
Sportspeople from Melun
Association football goalkeepers
French footballers
France youth international footballers
AS Monaco FC players
Clermont Foot players
En Avant Guingamp players
FC Metz players
Ligue 2 players
Ligue 1 players
Expatriate footballers in Monaco
Footballers from Seine-et-Marne